The Angus Book Award is a literary award for UK authors of teenage fiction. It is awarded by Angus Council in Scotland. The award is decided by the votes of the secondary schools in Angus. The pupils host the awards every year. The ceremony is hosted by a different school each year. For example, in 2007 the award was hosted in Arbroath High School by Christy Scott and Jason McNulty both of which were current third year pupils.

List of past winners
1996 Sue Welford, The Night After Tomorrow
1997 Malcolm Rose, Tunnel Vision
1998 Robert Swindells, Unbeliever
1999 Tim Bowler, River Boy
2000 Tim Bowler, Shadows
2001 Malcolm Rose, Plague
2002 Bali Rai, (Un)arranged Marriage
2003 Keith Gray, Warehouse
2004 Alan Gibbons, The Edge
2005 Terence Blacker, Boy2Girl
2006 Graham Joyce, TWOC
2007 Kevin Brooks, Candy
2008 Kate Cann, Leaving Poppy
2009 Anne Cassidy, Forget Me Not 
2010 Rachel Ward, Numbers2011 Keren David, When I Was Joe2012 Kevin Brooks, iBoy2013 Teri Terry, Slated2014 Matt Whyman, The Savages2015 Carmen Reid, Cross my HeartShortlists
1996
Theresa Breslin, KezzieMelvin Burgess, The Baby and Fly PieChrista Laird, But Can The Phoenix Sing?Maggie Prince, Memoirs of a Dangerous AlienSue Welford, The Night After Tomorrow1997
Gillian Cross, New WorldZoe Halliday, Brother Cat, Brother ManJohn Loveday, Goodbye Buffalo SkyCatherine MacPhail, Run, Zan, RunMalcolm Rose, Tunnel Vision1998
Lynne Reid Banks, Broken BridgeJulie Bertagna, The Spark GapAnn Halam, The PowerhouseIan Strachan, Which Way Is Home?Robert Swindells, Unbeliever1999
Tim Bowler, River BoyHenrietta Branford, Chance of SafetyMelvin Burgess, Tiger, TigerAnnie Campling, And The Stars Were GoldMichael Cronin, Against the Day2000
Bernard Ashley, Tiger Without TeethTim Bowler, ShadowsGillian Cross, TightropeAnthony Masters, Days of the DeadJenny Nimmo, The Rinaldi Ring2001
Catherine MacPhail, MissingBeverley Naidoo, The Other Side of TruthCelia Rees, Truth or DareHazel Riley, ThanisMalcolm Rose, Plague2002
Malachy Doyle, GeorgieCarol Hedges, JigsawAnthony Horowitz, StormbreakerGeraldine McCaughrean, The Kite RiderBali Rai, (Un)arranged Marriage2003
Louise Cooper, Demon CrossingKeith Gray, WarehouseAlison Prince, Oranges and MurderMalcolm Rose, BloodlineNicky Singer, Feather Boy2004
Julie Bertagna, ExodusAlan Gibbons, The EdgeKeith Gray, MalarkeyPhilip Reeve, Mortal EnginesMalcolm Rose, Clone2005
Alison Allen-Gray, UniqueTerence Blacker, Boy2GirlMartin Chatterton, Michigan Moorcroft, R.I.P.Graham Gardner, Inventing ElliotMark Roberts, Tomorrow Belongs to Me2006
Anne Cassidy, Looking For JJChris D'Lacey, IcefireCatherine Forde, SkarrsGraham Joyce, TWOCBeverley Naidoo, Web of Lies (novel)2007
Theresa Breslin, Divided CityKevin Brooks, CandyAlan Gibbons, Hold OnSue Mayfield, DamageMarcus Sedgwick, The Foreshadowing2008
Sherry Ashworth, Close-UpKate Cann, Leaving PoppyJ. A. Henderson, Bunker 10Graham Marks, Omega PlaceAnthony McGowan, Henry Tumour''

References

External links

Angus Book Award Angus Book Award

Scottish literary awards
Angus, Scotland
Awards established in 1996
1996 establishments in the United Kingdom
Young adult literature awards